Ein HaMifratz (lit. Bayview) is a kibbutz near Acre in northern Israel. Located on the Mediterranean coast, it falls under the jurisdiction of Mateh Asher Regional Council.

History

Kibbutz Ein HaMifratz was established in August 1938 by Polish immigrants as part of the tower and stockade settlement enterprise, during the 1936–39 Arab revolt.

According to the Jewish National Fund, upon its founding, Ein HaMifratz was immediately attacked by "Arab gangs". The initial problems facing the settlers were the saltwater swamps and the shifting sands at the mouth of the Na'aman River.  The settler originally did  mixed farming and fish breeding. By 1947 the kibbutz had a population of 400.

Until the capture of Acre, Ein Hamifratz was a frontline settlement. The settlers were involved in the conquest of the Galilee in November 1948.

Economy
Major industries are Yamaton Ltd., a honeycomb paper factory operated jointly with Kibbutz Ga'aton, and IMA, a corrugated cardboard manufacturing company. Ein Hamifratz also operates a fish farm and a shopping mall.

Notable people
 Amnon Eshkol
 Avraham Ofek

References

Kibbutzim
Kibbutz Movement
Populated places established in 1938
Jewish villages in Mandatory Palestine
Populated places in Northern District (Israel)
Polish-Jewish culture in Israel
1938 establishments in Mandatory Palestine